Pishtane is a small village in Slivnitsa Municipality, Sofia Province, located in western Bulgaria 14 km south-west of the town of Slivnitsa. 

Villages in Sofia Province